Marianivka may refer to several places in Ukraine:

Urban-type settlements
 Marianivka, Volyn Oblast
 Marianivka, Zhytomyr Oblast

Villages
 Marianivka, Zvenyhorodka Raion, Cherkasy Oblast, village in Zvenyhorodka Raion
 Marianivka, Bila Tserkva Raion, Kyiv Oblast
 Maryanivka (formerly Ubizhyshche), Hrebinka Raion, Poltava Oblast
 Marianivka, Kakhovka Raion, Kherson Oblast